The Meteorological Office, abbreviated as the Met Office, is the United Kingdom's national weather service. It is an executive agency and trading fund of the Department for Business, Energy and Industrial Strategy and is led by CEO Penelope Endersby, who took on the role as Chief Executive in December 2018 and is the first woman to do so. The Met Office makes meteorological predictions across all timescales from weather forecasts to climate change.

History 
 The Met Office was established on 1 August 1854 as a small department within the Board of Trade under Vice Admiral Robert FitzRoy as a service to mariners. The loss of the passenger vessel, the Royal Charter, and 459 lives off the coast of Anglesey in a violent storm in October 1859 led to the first gale warning service. FitzRoy established a network of 15 coastal stations from which visual gale warnings could be provided for ships at sea.

The new electric telegraph enabled rapid dissemination of warnings and also led to the development of an observational network which could then be used to provide synoptic analysis. The Met Office started in 1861 to provide weather forecasts to newspapers. FitzRoy requested the daily traces of the photo-barograph at Kew Observatory (invented by Francis Ronalds) to assist in this task and similar barographs and as well as instruments to continuously record other meteorological parameters were later provided to stations across the observing network. Publication of forecasts ceased in May 1866 after FitzRoy's death but recommenced in April 1879.

Connection with the Ministry of Defence 

Following the First World War, the Met Office became part of the Air Ministry in 1919, the weather observed from the top of Adastral House (where the Air Ministry was based) giving rise to the phrase "The weather on the Air Ministry roof". As a result of the need for weather information for aviation, the Met Office located many of its observation and data collection points on RAF airfields, and this accounts for the large number of military airfields mentioned in weather reports even today. In 1936 the Met Office split with services to the Royal Navy being provided by its own forecasting services.

It became an executive agency of the Ministry of Defence in April 1990, a quasi-governmental role, being required to act commercially.

Changes of ministry

Following a machinery of government change, the Met Office became part of the Department for Business, Innovation and Skills on 18 July 2011, and subsequently part of the Department for Business, Energy and Industrial Strategy following the merger of BIS and the Department of Energy and Climate Change on 14 July 2016.

Although no longer part of the MOD, the Met Office maintains strong links with the military through its front line offices at RAF and Army bases both in the UK and overseas and its involvement in the Joint Operations Meteorology and Oceanography Centre (JOMOC) with the Royal Navy. The Mobile Met Unit (MMU) are a unit consisting of Met Office staff who are also RAF reservists who accompany forward units in times of conflict advising the armed forces of the conditions for battle, particularly the RAF.

Locations 

In September 2003 the Met Office moved its headquarters from Bracknell in Berkshire to a purpose-built £80m structure at Exeter Business Park, near junction 29 of the M5 motorway. The new building was officially opened on 21 June 2004 – a few weeks short of the Met Office's 150th anniversary – by Robert May, Baron May of Oxford.

It has a worldwide presenceincluding a forecasting centre in Aberdeen, and offices in Gibraltar and on the Falklands. Other outposts lodge in establishments such as the MetOffice@Reading (formerly the Joint Centre for Mesoscale Meteorology) at University of Reading in Berkshire, the Joint Centre for Hydro-Meteorological Research (JCHMR) site at Wallingford in Oxfordshire, and there is a Met Office presence at Army and Air Force bases within the UK and abroad (including frontline units in conflict zones). Royal Navy weather forecasts are generally provided by naval officers, not Met Office personnel.

Forecasts

Shipping forecast 

The Shipping Forecast is produced by the Met Office and broadcast on BBC Radio 4, for those traversing the seas around the British Isles.

Weather forecasting and warnings 
The Met Office issues Severe Weather Warnings for the United Kingdom through the National Severe Weather Warning Service (NSWWS). These warn of weather events that may affect transport infrastructure and endanger people's lives. In March 2008, the system was improved and a new stage of warning was introduced, the 'Advisory'.

The Met Office along with Irish counterpart Met Éireann introduced a storm naming system in September 2015 to provide a single authoritative naming system for the storms that affect the UK and Ireland. The first named storm under this system, Abigail was announced on 10 November 2015. In 2019, the Met Office and Met Éireann were joined by Dutch national weather forecasting service the Royal Netherlands Meteorological Institute(KNMI).

Weather prediction models 
The main role of the Met Office is to produce forecast models by gathering information from weather satellites in space and observations on earth, then processing it with a variety of models, based on a software package known as the unified model. The principal weather products for UK customers are 36-hour forecasts from the operational 1.5 km resolution UKV model covering the UK and surroundings (replacing the 4 km model), 48-hour forecasts from the 12 km resolution NAE model covering Europe and the North Atlantic, and 144-hour forecasts from the 25 km resolution global model (replacing the 40 km global model). The Met Office's Global Model forecast has consistently been in the top 3 for global weather forecast performance (in the decades up to 2010) in independent verification to WMO standards. Products for other regions of the globe are sold to customers abroad, provided for MOD operations abroad or provided free to developing countries in Africa. If necessary, forecasters may make adjustments to the computer forecasts. Data is stored in the Met Office's own PP-format.

Flood Forecasting Centre

Formed in 2009, the Flood Forecasting Centre (FFC) is a joint venture between the Environment Agency and the Met Office to provide flood risk guidance for England and Wales. The Centre is jointly staffed from both parent organisations and is based in the Operations Centre at the Met Office headquarters in Exeter. In Scotland this role is performed by the Scottish Flood Forecasting Service, a joint venture between the Scottish Environment Protection Agency (SEPA) and the Met Office.

Seasonal forecasts 
The Met Office makes seasonal and long range forecasts and distributes them to customers and users globally. The Met Office was the first climate and weather forecast provider to be recognised as a Global Producing Centre of long range forecasts by the World Meteorological Organisation and continues to provide forecasts to the WMO for dissemination to other national meteorological services worldwide.

Met Office research has broken new ground in seasonal forecasting for the extratropics and has demonstrated its abilities in its seasonal predictions of the North Atlantic Oscillation and winter climate for Europe and North America.

Supply of forecasts for broadcasting companies 
One of the main media companies, ITV produce forecasts for ITV Weather using the Met Office's data and animated weather symbols.

The BBC used to use Met Office forecasts for all of its output, but on 23 August 2015, it was announced that the BBC would be replacing the Met Office with MeteoGroup, a competing provider, as part of the corporation's legal obligation to provide best value for money for the licence fee payers. The BBC still uses some Met Office data for certain forecasts, particularly severe weather warnings and the Shipping Forecast.

World Area Forecast Centre 

The Met Office is one of only two World Area Forecast Centres or WAFCs, and is referred to as WAFC London. The other WAFC is located in Kansas City, Missouri, and known as WAFC Washington. WAFC data is used daily to safely and economically route aircraft, particularly on long-haul journeys. The data provides details of wind speed and direction, air temperature, cloud type and tops, and other features.

Volcanic Ash Advisory Centre 

As part of its aviation forecast operation the Met Office operates the London Volcanic Ash Advisory Centre (VAAC). This provides forecasts to the aviation industry of volcanic ash clouds that could enter aircraft flight paths and impact aviation safety. The London VAAC, one of nine worldwide, is responsible for the area covering the British Isles, the north east Atlantic and Iceland. The VAAC were set up by the International Civil Aviation Organization (ICAO), an agency of the United Nations, as part of the International Airways Volcano Watch (IAVW). The London VAAC makes use of satellite images, plus seismic, radar and visual observation data from Iceland, the location of all of the active volcanoes in its area of responsibility. The NAME dispersion model developed by the Met Office is used to forecast the movement of the ash clouds 6, 12 and 18 hours from the time of the alert at different flight levels.

Air quality 

The Met Office issues air quality forecasts made using NAME, the Met Office's medium-to-long-range atmospheric dispersion model. It was developed as a nuclear accident model following the Chernobyl accident in 1986, but has since evolved into an all-purpose dispersion model capable of predicting the transport, transformation and deposition of a wide class of airborne materials. NAME is used operationally by the Met Office as an emergency response model as well as for routine air quality forecasting. Aerosol dispersion is calculated using the United Kingdom Chemistry and Aerosols model.

The forecast is produced for pollutants and their typical health effects are shown in the following table.

IPCC

Until 2001 the Met Office hosted the Intergovernmental Panel on Climate Change working group, chaired by John Houghton, on climate science. In 2001 the working group moved to the National Oceanic and Atmospheric Administration.

High performance computing 
Due to the large amount of computation needed for Numerical Weather Prediction and the Unified model, the Met Office has had some of the most powerful supercomputers in the world. In November 1997 the Met Office supercomputer was ranked third in the world.

Customer service
Since 2012 the Met Office Contact Centre (known as the Weather Desk) has been part of Contact Centre Panel's 'Top 50 Companies for Customer Service' programme.

In 2015 the Met Office won awards in the following categories:
 Rated 1st Overall for Combined Channels
 Most Improved Overall for Social Media
 Rated 2nd Overall for Call Service
 Rated 1st Overall for Email Service
 Best in Public Sector
 Best Extra Small Centre

Weather stations 
Reports (observations) from weather stations can be automatic (totally machine produced), semi-automatic (part-machine and part manual), or manual. Some stations produce manual observations during business hours and revert to automatic observations outside these times. Many stations feature "present weather" sensors, CCTV, etc. There is also a network of 'upper air' stations, using radiosondes. The six main radiosonde stations in the UK are Camborne, Lerwick, Albemarle, Watnall, Castor Bay and Herstmonceux.

Some stations have limited reporting times, while other report continuously, mainly RAF and Army Air Corps stations where a manned met office is provided for military operations. The "standard" is a once-hourly reporting schedule, but automatic stations can often be "polled" as required, while stations at airfields report twice-hourly, with additional (often frequent in times of bad weather) special reports as necessary to inform airfield authorities of changes to the weather that may affect aviation operations.

Some stations report only CLIMAT data (e.g. maximum and minimum temperatures, rainfall totals over a period, etc.) and these are usually recorded at 0900 and 2100 hours daily. Weather reports are often performed by observers not specifically employed by the Met Office, such as Air traffic control staff, coastguards, university staff and so on.

 Eskdalemuir Observatory
 Lerwick Observatory
 Penkridge weather station
 Prestatyn weather station
 Stonyhurst
 Sutton Bonington
 Wye weather station
 RAF Benson
 RAF Brize Norton weather station
 RAF Coningsby
 RAF Cottesmore
 RAF Cranwell weather station
 RAF Kinloss weather station
 RAF Leeming weather station
 RAF Leuchars weather station
 RAF Linton-on-Ouse weather station
 RAF Little Rissington weather station (supported by RAF Brize Norton)
 RAF Lossiemouth weather station
 RAF Lyneham weather station
 RAF Marham weather station
 RAF Northolt weather station 51.55 N 0.417 W
 RAF Odiham weather station
 RAF Shawbury
 RAF Waddington weather station
 AAC Wattisham weather station
 RAF Valley
 AAC Middle Wallop weather station

Meteorological Research Unit and the Facility for Airborne Atmospheric Measurements (FAAM)

Meteorological Research was carried out at RAE Bedford with instruments being carried by barrage balloons until the RAE facility closed in the 1980s.

The Met Office association with Cardington continues by maintaining a Meteorological Research Unit (MRU). This is responsible for conducting research into part of the atmosphere called the boundary layer by using a tethered balloon which is kept in a small portable hangar.

FAAM

 
The Facility for Airborne Atmospheric Measurements (FAAM), part of the National Centre for Atmospheric Science, is based at Cranfield Airport. It is a collaboration with the Natural Environment Research Council.

The FAAM was established as part of the National Centre for Atmospheric Science (NCAS), itself part of NERC, to provide aircraft measurement for use by UK atmospheric research organisations on worldwide campaigns. The main equipment is a modified BAe 146 type 301 aircraft, registration G-LUXE, owned and operated by BAE Systems on behalf of Directflight Limited.

Areas of application include: 
 Radiative transfer studies in clear and cloudy air;
 Tropospheric chemistry measurements;
 Cloud physics and dynamic studies;
 Dynamics of mesoscale weather systems;
 Boundary layer and turbulence studies;
 Remote sensing: verification of ground-based instruments;
 Satellite ground truth: radiometric measurements and winds;
 Satellite instrument test-bed;
 Campaigns in the UK and abroad.

Directors General and Chief Executives 
 Sir William Napier Shaw 1905–1920
 Sir Graham Sutton 1954–1965
 Sir Basil John Mason 1965–1983
 Sir John Houghton 1983–1991
 Julian Hunt 1992–1997
 Peter Ewins 1997–2004
 David Rogers 2004–2005
 Mark Hutchinson 2005–2007
 John Hirst 2007–2014
 Rob Varley 2014–2018
 Penelope Endersby 2018–

See also 
 Climatic Research Unit hacking incident
 Climate of the United Kingdom
 Climate change in the United Kingdom
 Burns' Day storm
 Eskdalemuir Observatory
 European Centre for Medium-Range Weather Forecasts
 Great Storm of 1987
 Met Éireann, the Irish meteorological service, which separated from the UK Met Office in 1936.
 North West Shelf Operational Oceanographic System
 Winter storm naming in the United Kingdom and Ireland

References

Further reading 
 Hunt, Roger, "The end of weather forecasting at Met Office London", Weather magazine, Royal Meteorological Society, June 2007, v.62, no.6, pp. 143–146
 Walker, Malcolm (J M), History of the Meteorological Office (December 2011) Cambridge University Press

External links 

 
 BBC Weather Centre
 BBC Shipping Forecast page
 Met Office (National Meteorological) Archive
 MetOffice@Reading at University of Reading
 Joint Centre for Hydro-Meteorological Research
 Met Office news blog
 

 
Atmospheric dispersion modeling
Climate of the United Kingdom
Companies based in Exeter
Department for Business, Innovation and Skills
Economy of Devon
Executive agencies of the United Kingdom government
Government-owned companies of the United Kingdom
Governmental meteorological agencies in Europe
Information technology organisations based in the United Kingdom
Organisations based in Devon
Organizations established in 1854
Science and technology in Devon
Trading funds of the United Kingdom government
1854 establishments in the United Kingdom